Haideng (also sometimes spelled as Hai Teng and Hai-tank in older translations) (14 August 1902–11 January 1989) was a Buddhist monk, martial artist and emeritus abbot of Shaolin Temple during the 20th century. He was born Fan Wubing in Jiangyou County, Sichuan province. His parents gave him the name "Fan Wubing", which means Fan the Never Sick, in hopes that this might improve his being constantly sick when he was young.

At the age of 19, Fan Wubing was accepted into Sichuan University, but did not attend due to financial difficulties. Instead, he attended Sichuan Police Academy, but later dropped out in pursuit of martial arts training.

Hai Deng was famous for his one-finger Chan, one of the 72 arts of the Shaolin temple, with which he could support most of his body weight on one finger. Thanks to a visit to the USA in 1985, he was noted for his religious observance, literary skill, and qigong talents. He Was first met with the Master Xu Yun (Empty Cloud.)

References

External links
https://www.youtube.com/watch?v=NExoT38sjj4 video of Hai Deng performing his "One finger Chan".
https://www.youtube.com/watch?v=LMdj6FDcQMo&NR video of Hai Deng's student performing Two Finger Chan.

Hai Teng
People's Republic of China Buddhist monks
Year of birth missing
Chinese martial artists

zh:释海灯